Love and the First Railway is a 1934 German historical comedy film directed by Robert Neppach and starring Jakob Tiedtke, Ida Wüst, and Karin Hardt. The plot revolves around the construction of the railway line between Berlin and Potsdam in the 1830s, the first in the Kingdom of Prussia.

The film's sets were designed by the art director Otto Guelstorff.

Main cast

References

Bibliography

External links 
 

1934 films
1930s historical comedy films
Films of Nazi Germany
German historical comedy films
1930s German-language films
Films directed by Robert Neppach
UFA GmbH films
Films set in Berlin
Films set in the 1830s
Rail transport films
German black-and-white films
1930s German films